Do Palangu (also Romanized as Do Palangū) is a village in Bord Khun Rural District, Bord Khun District, Deyr County, Bushehr Province, Iran. At the 2006 census, its population was 55, in 13 families.

References 

Populated places in Deyr County